Gordonia (minor planet designation: 305 Gordonia) is a fairly typical, although sizeable Main belt asteroid.

It was discovered by Auguste Charlois on 16 February 1891 in Nice and named after James Gordon Bennett Jr., his patron.

References

External links 
 
 

000305
Discoveries by Auguste Charlois
Named minor planets
000305
18910216